Calamvale Community College is a co-educational, independent state school established in 2002 in Brisbane, Queensland, Australia.

History 

The College opened in 2002 with 1150 students ranging from preschool to Year 8. In 2003, Year 9 was added and the enrolment was 1540. In 2006, Calamvale Community College became preschool to Year 12 with an estimated final enrolment of around 2200.

The college is organised into two sub-schools each with its own principal and staff. The College Principal provides the over–arching leadership for the college. Each sub-school caters for a select range of grades; the junior campus caters for prep to year 6, and the secondary campus caters for years 7 to 12.

See also 
List of schools in Queensland

External links 
 Calamvale Community College EQ Website
 Education Queensland
 PMs Address to the Calamvale Community College
 ANTI-DISCRIMINATION TRIBUNAL QUEENSLAND Decision RE: N o.b.o N

References 

Public high schools in Brisbane
Educational institutions established in 2002
2002 establishments in Australia
Public primary schools in Brisbane